Khidmat Guzar is a Pakistani television series, directed by Fahim Burney. It features Azfar Rehman, Noor Zafar Khan, Shahzad Nawaz and Eshal Fayyaz in lead roles. The story revolves around love and revenge of Mukhtar, servant in the home of fedual lord, Rana Jalal.

Plot
In a remote village, Rana Jalal serves as the feudal lord and takes the decision on regular issues of the inhabitants of the rural people. Therefore, he's very strict regarding discipline and honor of women of his family. Jalal's eldest daughter Seerat likes his cousin Owais. However, Jalal hates Owais's family due to complex family issues. Jalal was unaware of the affair between Seerat and Owais. But as soon as a young servant, Mukhtar came to the Jalal's palace he started eavesdropping within the family and disclose the secret affair of Seerat and Owais to Jalal. Being worried about the family honor, Jalal asked his nephew, Wajahat to marry Seerat overnight. But right before the marriage Wajahat becomes aware of the fact that Seerat loves Owais and rejects the marriage proposal. On such disgrace Jalal threatens to commit suicide but to save her father Seerat commits suicide. Years passes by and Mukhtar grows up and continues to ruin the lives of Jalal's family out of jealousy and greed to have the life like a feudal lord.

Cast
Shahzad Nawaz as Rana Jalal; a hot-headed feudal lord and Seerat, Dua, Shuja's father. 
Azfar Rehman as Mukhtar; a cunning servant at Rana Jalal's palace
Mouzzam Bhatti as Mukhtar (Kid)
Noor Zafar Khan as Dua; younger sister of Seerat 
Hamna Aamir as Dua (Kid)
Hammad Shoaib as Shuja; younger brother of Seerat and Dua
Sadoon Ali as Shuja (Kid)
Eshal Fayyaz as Seerat; eldest daughter of Jalal and Kulsoom. She is in love with Owais but her father dislike Owais's family due to family issues and want her to get married to Wajahat
Munazza Arif as Kulsoom; Rana Jalal's spouse
Ali Josh as Adeel Murtaza; Dua's university mate who likes her
Saniya Shamshad as Heer; Shuja's love interest
Maria Malik as Shammi; female servant at Jalal's palace
Salman Saeed as Owais; Seerat's love interest 
Hammad Abbas as Wajahat aka Wajji; Jalal's nephew 
Zafar Abbas as Qasim; Jalal's brother and Wajahat and Safi's father
Shehla Khan as Shehla; Wajahat and Safi's mother
Tasneem Kausar as Aayi; Heer's mother
Imran Ahmed as SP; Adeel's father
Nabeel Aslam as Safi; Dua's fiancé and Jalal's nephew

Soundtrack 
The soundtrack of the series was performed by Damia Farooq and Hamza Malik with music composition by Naveed Nashad on the lyrics of Mubashir Hassan.

Broadcast & Release
Khidmat Guzar aired on A-Plus Entertainment originally airing weekly episodes at prime time.

Digital Release
Alongside its airing on television, it was also released on YouTube. It is available for streaming on OTT subscription platform Zee5 in multiple countries. In Arab World, it is released under title "خادم القصر" dubbed in Arabic on paid subscription site "Asia4Arabs".

References

External links
 

2017 Pakistani television series debuts
2018 Pakistani television series endings
Pakistani drama television series
Urdu-language television shows